Peter Czupryna is a former West German slalom canoeist who competed from the mid-1970s to the early 1980s. He won two medals in the C-2 event at the ICF Canoe Slalom World Championships with a gold in 1979 and a silver in 1981.

References

German male canoeists
Living people
Year of birth missing (living people)
Medalists at the ICF Canoe Slalom World Championships